The Thailand national baseball team is the national baseball team of Thailand. They have competed in numerous international competitions, including the Southeast Asian Games, the Asian Games, and the Baseball World Cup. The team is organized by the Amateur Baseball Association of Thailand.

In 2007 the Thailand national baseball team won the Southeast Asian Games and they finished third in the 2011 Southeast Asian Games.  The Thailand national team competed in the World Baseball Classic qualifiers in the fall of 2012.

Johnny Damon, active until 2012, was the only player in major league baseball with a connection to Thailand.  His mother is Thai.

As of September 2016, Thailand's men's team was ranked No. 26 by the World Baseball Softball Confederation. In women's baseball, Thailand is unranked.

International tournament results

World Baseball Classic

References

National baseball teams in Asia
Baseball
Baseball in Thailand